Hypocharis is a monotypic moth genus in the family Arctiidae erected by George Hampson in 1898. Its single species, Hypocharis clusia, was first described by Herbert Druce in 1897. It is found in the Amazon region.

References

Arctiinae